The 2016 Temple Owls football team represented Temple University in the 2016 NCAA Division I FBS football season. The Owls were led by fourth-year head coach Matt Rhule and played their home games at Lincoln Financial Field. They were members of the East Division of the American Athletic Conference.

On December 6, Rhule resigned to become the head coach at Baylor. Special teams coordinator and tight ends coach Ed Foley led the Owls in the Military Bowl.

Schedule

Schedule Source:

Roster

Game summaries

Army

Stony Brook

at Penn State

Charlotte

SMU

at Memphis

at UCF

South Florida

Cincinnati

at UConn

at Tulane

East Carolina

at Navy–American Athletic Championship Game

The Owls dominated a Navy Midshipmen football offense that was ranked in the top 20 in the country, coming off a 75-point offensive outburst the week before to win the first major conference title in Temple history. Temple sent one of its largest away crowds ever, with nearly half the fans in attendance supporting the Owls. Temple was ranked in all three major polls following the game and were invited to the Military Bowl vs Wake Forest Demon Deacons football on December 27, 2016.

Wake Forest–Military Bowl

Awards and honors

American Athletic Conference All-Conference Team

First Team
Dion Dawkins, OT
Haason Reddick, DL

Second Team
Jahad Thomas, RB
Praise Martin-Oguike, DL
Avery Williams, LB
Sean Chandler, S
Aaron Boumerhi, K

Honorable Mention
Colin Thompson, TE
Stephaun Marshall, LB

Rankings

NFL Players

NFL Draft Combine

Four Temple players were invited to participate in the 2017 NFL Scouting Combine.

† Top performer

2017 NFL Draft

Following the season, the following members of the Temple football team were selected in the 2017 NFL Draft.

Undrafted Free Agents

In addition to the draft selections above, the following Temple players signed NFL contracts after the draft.

References

Temple
Temple Owls football seasons
American Athletic Conference football champion seasons
Temple Owls football